Nolan Brian Gorman (born May 10, 2000) is an American professional baseball second baseman for the St. Louis Cardinals of Major League Baseball (MLB).

Born and raised in Phoenix, Arizona, Gorman was drafted by the Cardinals out of high school in the 2018 Major League Baseball draft. Gorman became one of the top prospects in baseball and played in their minor league system before making his MLB debut and becoming a part of their starting lineup in 2022.

Amateur career
Gorman attended Sandra Day O'Connor High School in Phoenix, Arizona. He committed to play college baseball at the University of Arizona in August 2015. In 2016, as a sophomore, he batted .490 with 11 home runs and 49 RBIs, and in 2017, as a junior, he batted .361 with 11 home runs and 34 RBIs. That July, he won in the MLB High School Home Run Derby in Miami, Florida. Later that month, he played in the Under Armour All-America Baseball Game and won their home run derby. In September, he played for the USA Baseball 18U National Team, helping lead Team USA to their fourth consecutive gold medal. In 2018, as a senior, Gorman slashed .421/.641/.894 with ten home runs, helping lead O'Connor to a 6A baseball state championship.

Professional career

Minor leagues
The St. Louis Cardinals picked Gorman in the first round, with the 19th overall selection, of the 2018 Major League Baseball draft. He signed with St. Louis for $3.231 million and was assigned to the Johnson City Cardinals of the Rookie Appalachian League. He homered in the second at-bat of his first professional game. During his stint in Johnson City, he was named an Appalachian League All-Star along with being named the league's Player of the Week for July 30 – August 5. After batting .345/.440/.662 with 11 home runs and 28 RBIs in 37 games, he was promoted to the Peoria Chiefs of the Class A Midwest League in August. He finished the season with Peoria, batting .202 with six home runs and 16 RBIs in 25 games for the Chiefs.

Gorman returned to Peoria to begin the 2019 season. He was named the Midwest League's first Player of the Week for the 2019 season on April 15 after batting .395 with four home runs and 13 RBIs. In June, he was named to the Midwest League All-Star Game, and competed in the Home Run Derby. On June 19, he was promoted to the Palm Beach Cardinals of the Class A-Advanced Florida State League. In July, he represented the Cardinals in the 2019 All-Star Futures Game alongside Dylan Carlson. Over 125 games between Peoria and Palm Beach, Gorman slashed .248/.326/.439 with 15 home runs and 62 RBIs.

After the Cardinals acquired All-Star third baseman Nolan Arenado prior to the 2021 season, Gorman began practicing at second base after being a third baseman all throughout his high school and professional career. To begin the 2021 season, Gorman was assigned to the Springfield Cardinals of the Double-A Central. On June 12, 2021, in a game against the Arkansas Travelers, he became the first Springfield player to hit three home runs in a single regular season game. After slashing .288/.354/.508 with 11 home runs and 27 RBIs over 43 games, he was promoted to the Memphis Redbirds of the Triple-A East in late June. That same month, Gorman was selected to play and represent the Cardinals (alongside Matthew Liberatore) in his second All-Star Futures Game. Over 76 games with Memphis, Gorman slashed .274/.320/.465 with 14 home runs and 48 RBIs. He was selected to play in the Arizona Fall League for the Glendale Desert Dogs after the season where he was named to the Fall Stars Game.

Major leagues
Gorman returned to Memphis to begin the 2022 season. After slashing .308/.367/.677 with 15 home runs and 23 RBIs over 34 games, the Cardinals announced on May 19 that they would be selecting his contract and promoting him to the major leagues to make his MLB debut the next day as the starting second baseman. In his first at-bat, he singled against Zach Thompson of the Pittsburgh Pirates, and finished the night one-for-three with a walk. On May 28, Gorman hit his first MLB home run versus Adrian Houser of the Milwaukee Brewers in an 8–3 win. Gorman missed playing time in early June due to back stiffness, but was not placed on the injured list. On June 21, versus the Brewers, he had his first two-home run game.

Gorman hit the second of a record-tying four consecutive home runs on July 2, 2022, the 11th such occurrence in major league history.  At Citizens Bank Park in Philadelphia, Nolan Arenado, Gorman, Juan Yepez and Dylan Carlson all homered off Phillies starter Kyle Gibson with two outs in the first inning.  It was the first time that the Cardinals had accomplished the feat, and the first time that it occurred in the first inning. On September 19, the Cardinals optioned him to Memphis. He remained with Memphis until the season's end, when he was then added to the Cardinals' roster for the Wild Card Series. Over 89 games and 283 at-bats during the regular season with St. Louis, he slashed .226/.300/.420 with 14 home runs, 35 RBIs, and 13 doubles.

Personal life
Gorman has been friends with fellow 2018 first round pick and Cardinals teammate, Matthew Liberatore, since they were five. Gorman was the first player born in the year 2000 to be drafted by an MLB team. He also went to Stetson hills

References

External links

2000 births
Living people
Baseball players from Phoenix, Arizona
Major League Baseball infielders
St. Louis Cardinals players
United States national baseball team players
Johnson City Cardinals players
Peoria Chiefs players
Palm Beach Cardinals players
Springfield Cardinals players
Memphis Redbirds players
Glendale Desert Dogs players